It's Called Life is the debut studio album by Canadian rapper Eternia. The album was nominated for Rap Recording of the Year at the 2006 Juno Awards.

Track listing
"Truth" – 0:53
"Evidence" - 3:27
"Hate" - 4:20 
"Beef" - 0:41 
"Family" (featuring Helixx C & DJ Dopey) - 3:35
"Time" - 2:15 
"Control" - 3:48
"Understand (If I)" (featuring Freestyle) - 3:53
"Balance" - 4:18
"Death" - 1:23
"Love" (featuring Jessica Kaya) - 4:09
"Struggle" (featuring Wordsworth & Kenn Starr) - 4:18
"Girls" - 0:31
"Inspiration" - 2:11
"Bang" - 4:05

2005 albums
Albums produced by Tone Mason